Cheyenne Carron (22 May 1976), is a French film director, screenwriter, and producer.

Biography
Born on 22 May 1976, she was abandoned at the age of three months. She chose her first name in reference to her little foster brother, a Guatemalan Indian. Her foster family has adopted three children in addition to two natural children.

Filmography

 2001: A une Madone
 2005: Ecorchés
 2009: Extase
 2011: Ne nous soumets pas à la tentation
 2013: The Public Daughter (La Fille Publique)
 2014: The Apostle (L'Apôtre) - César French Academy proposal
 2015: Homelands (Patries)
 2016: La Chute des Hommes
 2017: La Morsure des Dieux
 2018: Legio Patria Nostra (Jeunesse aux cœurs ardents)
 2019: Le Corps Sauvage
 2020: The King Son (Le Fils d'un Roi)
 2020: The Sun will Rise (Le Soleil Reviendra)
 2021: The Beauty of the World (La Beauté du Monde) - Oscar Fan Favorite proposal
 2023: Je m'abandonne à toi

References

External links

1976 births
French women film directors
French women film producers
21st-century French screenwriters
French women screenwriters
Living people
People from Valence, Drôme